Heath Common is a settlement in the Horsham District of West Sussex, England. It lies on the Storrington to Ashington road 1.5 miles (2.4 km) east of Storrington.

Horsham District
Villages in West Sussex